Tewfik Abdullah (also Tawfik Abdallah and variations, Arabic: توفيق عبد الله) (born 23 June 1896 in Cairo, Egypt) was an Egyptian football player, He was the second Egyptian to play in the English Football League and the first in the First Division. He was one of four Egyptians who played professional football in Britain before World War Il.

He began his career in Egypt with Cairo International SC, today's Zamalek, and played for Egypt in the 1920 Olympics. In England he featured for Derby County in the First Division. He further was active for some lower division clubs in England, Scotland and Wales before playing for several clubs in the American Soccer League between 1924 and 1928.  There he won the National Challenge Cup with the Fall River Marksmen.  After returning to Egypt he won the National Cup there with Al Ahly SC before returning to Cairo International. He finished his playing career in Canada. Later he was manager of Cairo International and the Egyptian national team.

Career

Beginnings in Egypt - Olympics 1920 
Tewfik Abdullah initially played for the Cairo International SC, often translated into Arabic as نادي القاهرة المختلط ("Nadi al-Qahrt al-Mukhtalit") and since 1952 known as Zamalek SC. With the Egyptian national team her participated at the 1920 Olympic Games in the Belgian city of Antwerp. There Egypt was ousted 1-2 in the first round by Italy. After this Egypt defeated Yugoslavia in a "consolation match" with 4-2. He participated in both matches.

United Kingdom
The Scottish Derby County player Tommy Barbour encountered Abdullah first, when he served with the Derbyshire Yeomanry in Egypt during the Great War. There he was inside right of an Egyptian XI which played the British Army in Cairo. After recommendation of Barbour Abdullah was tried out in a match of the Derby County reserves in mid September 1920. After he "pleased the crowd immensely" there, he was signed by the club a week later. He played his first match in the First Division in October, where he scored the first goal for the Rams in a 3-0 home win against Manchester City. Abdullah, whose first name Tewfik was soon transformed into his nickname "Toothpick", thus became the second Egyptian in professional English football after Hussein Hegazi, who played with him in the 1920 Olympics and who spent some years with Dulwich Hamlet FC in the Isthmian League and in 1911 completed a match with London's Fulham FC in the Second Division.  Abdullah's goal against City should remain his only goal and only win in a dozen league matches for Derby County in the 1920/21-season which ended in relegation. He stayed on, but got little playing time in the Second Division. Abdullah's ability with the ball found praise, but he was said to lack speed.

For the 1922/23 season, he joined the Scottish second division club Cowdenbeath FC which should finish eleventh. This transfer was made on the recommendation of his Derby teammate Willie Paterson, whose father Alex Paterson was coaching the Scots. Abdullah soon broke his arm there, but otherwise played well and regularly. In a later review, Alex Paterson described him as one of the "smartest footballers" he ever encountered. At the end of the season, it was initially said that he would go to America despite an offer to stay. Eventually, he moved to Bridgend Town in Wales, which was to be 13th in the Western Division of the Southern Football League. He played there until late February or early March 1924.

At the beginning of March 1924 he returned to England and joined Hartlepools United in the Third Division North, staying until early May. There he scored in his debut at the 4-0 debut against Wrexham. After the game, it was reported that he had increased the impact of the Hartlepools attack significantly and that he had gained a lot of weight and strength since he left Derby County. He was considered a "god-send", but Hartlepools finished the season on the penultimate place. For Abdullah, who played a total of eleven times, one goal stood.

American Soccer League 
As a result of the expansion of the American Soccer League for the 1924/25 season from eight to twelve teams, the steady stream of British, especially Scottish, footballers to the United States increased. There, the players besides a place in the team, got a job, mostly in the factory of the team owner, which then earned them up to three times the three or four pounds that the British clubs usually paid per week.

Abdullah joined the Providence Clamdiggers in Rhode Island. Abdullah, soon to be given the new nickname "Happy", ended the season there with 15 goals in 34 games. In 1925/26 he only managed seven goals in ten games and then two goals in 18 games. In three years he had accumulated 62 appearances and 24 goals for the Clamdiggers.

Later in the 1926/27 season, he moved to the Fall River Marksmen in Massachusetts, a top team of the time, for which he scored once in six matches until the end of the season. With the Marksmen, where he played again with Willie Paterson, he won the National Challenge Cup, predecessor of the US Open Cup, of 1927, albeit he was not on the pitch in the final. On 2 April 1927, he was also in a selection of the ASL, which was defeated 2-4 against the well-staffed national team of Uruguay. A week later he was part of a 1-1 draw against Uruguay with the Marksmen.

For the 1927/28 season, he switched to the newly founded Hartford Americans. The club withdrew early in the season and Abdullah only played eleven times for the Connecticut side. Until the end of the year, he then played eight games for the New York Nationals which were created at the beginning of the season by the controversial entrepreneur Charles Stoneham by transferring the Indiana Flooring franchise to the east coast metropolis. Still in 1928 followed a short comeback to the Marksmen where in February 1928 he had two games in which he marked one goal.

Return to Egypt - career end in Canada - management 
Once he returned to Egypt he joined Al Ahly SC of Cairo, winning the Sultan Hussein Cup of 1929 contributing one goal to the 2-0 victory against Scottish military side Dirhams in the final. In the following year he won the Egypt Cup with a 2-0 win in the final over Al Ittihad of Alexandria. After this he returned to Cairo International SC with which he reached the Egypt Cup final of 1931, losing there to 1-4 to Al Ahly.

It is reported, that in 1932 he returned to North America, joining Montreal Carsteel in Canada, where he saw out his playing years. The club won the Coupe du Québec, the Cup of Quebec, in the years of 1932 to 1934, and he might have been involved in the winning of these trophies.

After this he attempted to establish himself as coach in North America. As he did not succeed, he returned to Egypt, where for some time in the 1930s he managed Cairo International SC. Between 1940 and 1944 he headed the Egyptian national team.

Honours 
 National Challenge Cup: 1927
 Sultan Hussein Cup: 1929
 Egypt Cup: 1930
 Finalist: 1931

References
 
 Dr.Tarek Ahmed Said: Egyptian Football Net, 1996–2019
 Colin Jose: American Soccer League 1921-1931: The Golden Years of American Soccer, Scarecrow Press, Inc (Lanham, MD, USA), 1998, 

1896 births
Year of death missing
American Soccer League (1921–1933) players
Cowdenbeath F.C. players
Derby County F.C. players
English Football League players
Egyptian expatriate footballers
Egyptian expatriate sportspeople in Canada
Egyptian expatriate sportspeople in the United Kingdom
Egyptian expatriate sportspeople in the United States
Egyptian footballers
Expatriate footballers in England
Expatriate footballers in Scotland
Expatriate footballers in Wales
Expatriate soccer players in Canada
Expatriate soccer players in the United States
Fall River Marksmen players
Association football forwards
Footballers at the 1920 Summer Olympics
Olympic footballers of Egypt
Hartford Americans players
Hartlepool United F.C. players
Montreal Carsteel players
New York Nationals (ASL) players
Footballers from Cairo
Providence Clamdiggers players
Egyptian football managers
Egypt national football team managers
Bridgend Town A.F.C. players